Male dominance may refer to:

 Male dominance (BDSM)
 Male privilege
 Male supremacism
 Patriarchy, a system of social organization characterized by male dominance

See also
 Androcentrism, a worldview focusing on male supremacy
 Dominance (ethology), in non-human species